Putman is a surname. Notable people with the surname include:

Andrée Putman (1925–2013), French interior and product designer
Curly Putman (1930–2016), American songwriter
Joris Putman (born 1984), Dutch actor

See also
Putman Township, Fulton County, Illinois